Belaturricula turrita is a species of sea snail, a marine gastropod mollusk in the family Borsoniidae.

There are two subspecies :
 Belaturricula turrita multispiralis Dell, 1990
 Belaturricula turrita turrita (Strebel, 1908):  represented as Belaturricula turrita (Strebel, 1908)

Description
The length of the shell varies between 25 mm and 60 mm.

Distribution
This marine species occurs in the Antarctic waters of the Scotia Sea and off the South Shetlands, South Georgia and South Sandwich Islands

References

 Strebel, H., 1908. Die Gastropoden (mit Ausnahme de nackten Opisthobranchier). Wissenschaftliche Ergebnisse der Schwedischen Süd-polar-Expedition 1901–1903, 6 (1):1–111, 6 pls. 
  Bouchet P., Kantor Yu.I., Sysoev A. & Puillandre N. (2011) A new operational classification of the Conoidea. Journal of Molluscan Studies 77: 273–308.
 Kantor, Yuri I., Myroslaw G. Harasewych, and Nicolas Puillandre. "A critical review of Antarctic Conoidea (Neogastropoda)." Molluscan Research 36.3 (2016): 153–206.

External links
 Antarctic Invertebrates : Belaturricula turrita; accessed : 13 August 2011
 Schiaparelli, Stefano, Anne-Nina Lörz, and Riccardo Cattaneo-Vietti. "Diversity and distribution of mollusc assemblages on the Victoria Land coast and the Balleny Islands, Ross Sea, Antarctica." Antarctic Science 18.04 (2006): 615–631
 
 

turrita
Gastropods described in 1908